The Athletics at the 2016 Summer Paralympics – Men's 1500 metres T11 event at the 2016 Paralympic Games took place on 11–13 September 2016, at the Estádio Olímpico João Havelange.

Heats

Heat 1 
12:23 11 September 2016:

Heat 2 
12:30 11 September 2016:

Heat 3 
12:37 11 September 2016:

Final 
18:05 13 September 2016:

Notes

Athletics at the 2016 Summer Paralympics
2016 in men's athletics